Manoj Barpujari, a journalist based in Guwahati, received the Swarna Kamal for the best film critic at the National Film Awards (2011). He is a member of three film critics associations in India – FIPRESCI, Film Critics Circle of India (FCCI), and Indian Film Critics Association (IFCA). Representing these societies, he served as juror at several international film festivals, including Port of Spain, Almaty, Dhaka, Kerala, Kolkata, Bengaluru, and Hyderabad. He conducted a workshop on film criticism at the University of West Indies, St Augustine, Trinidad (2012), and presented documentaries from the North-East India at the media and communications department of Goldsmiths College, London (2008).

Citation for National Award for Best Film Critic
Swarna Kamal "For his understanding of the medium of cinema. His writings can be broadly classified into three areas: (1) Discussion on objective of cinema, (b) The craft of cinema, and (c) Cinema in North-East Indian and Assamese. Barpujari emphasis the significance of craft and promotion of constructive cinema, i.e., cinema which is not only entertainment. He has a social perspective with cinematic and creative sensibility".

Books
Manoj Barpujari has written/edited twelve books including three titles on cinema. He has several research papers on cinema to his credit and has written a chapter in the Routledge Handbook of Indian Cinemas (London, 2013). His travelogue Touching the Trinity is widely acclaimed and has been featured in a column at The Guardian (Trinidad & Tobago) and reviewed in The Telegraph (India). He is an accomplished Assamese poet and won the Munin Borkotoky Literary Award (2003).

References

External links
FIPRESCI
Film Critics Circle of India
Cinematic Illusions

Indian film critics
Best Critic National Film Award winners